Dragendorff is a surname. Notable people with the surname include:

Hans Dragendorff (1870–1941), German scholar 
Johann Georg Noel Dragendorff (1836–1898), German pharmacist and chemist
Dragendorff's reagent, used to detect alkaloids

German-language surnames